The Bahía Solano Fault, Utría Fault or Utría-Bahía Solano Fault is a westward dipping thrust fault in the department of Chocó on the Pacific Coast of Colombia. The fault is partly offshore in the bays of Solano and Utría and crosses the Chocó Basin and the coastal Serranía del Baudó. Movement of the fault produced the  6.5 1970 Bahía Solano earthquake.

Etymology 
The fault is named after Bahía Solano, Chocó.

Description 
The Bahía Solano Fault extends along the Pacific Coast of Colombia, bordering the Panama, Coiba, Malpelo and North Andes Plates. It bounds a structural valley between the Solano Bay and Utría Bay, and displaces the Eocene turbidites of the Uva Formation in the south, and Cretaceous oceanic Baudó Basalts in the north, The fault forms a well developed and continuous fault line (scarp), and the brecciated zone of the fault reaches  in width. The peninsulas of Cabo Corrientes and Bahía Solano are composed of oceanic crust displaced by the Bahía Solano Fault.

Segments of the fault have been called Utría Fault, and Utría-Bahía Solano Fault.

Activity 
The earthquake was followed by 123 aftershocks in the period from September 26 to October 7, 1970.

See also 

 List of earthquakes in Colombia
 Coiba Plate
 Andinobates altobueyensis

References

Bibliography

Maps

Further reading 
 

Seismic faults of Colombia
Thrust faults
Active faults
Earthquakes in Colombia
Faults
Geology of the Pacific Ocean
Colombia–Panama border